Laura Wilson (born September 27, 1969) is an American cross-country skier. She competed at the 1994 Winter Olympics and the 1998 Winter Olympics.

Born in New York, but raised in Montpelier, Vermont, Wilson was a four-time First Team All-American at the University of Vermont and part of the Catamounts' 1990 NCAA Championship team. In 2015, she was inducted into the Vermont Sports Hall of Fame.

Cross-country skiing results
All results are sourced from the International Ski Federation (FIS).

Olympic Games

World Championships

World Cup

Season standings

References

External links
 

1969 births
Living people
American female cross-country skiers
Olympic cross-country skiers of the United States
Cross-country skiers at the 1994 Winter Olympics
Cross-country skiers at the 1998 Winter Olympics
Sportspeople from Vermont
People from Montpelier, Vermont
University of Vermont alumni
Vermont Catamounts skiers
21st-century American women